A Small Light is an upcoming biographical drama miniseries set to air on Disney+ in spring 2023.

Premise
Depicts the story of Miep Gies, who is asked by her employer Otto Frank to shelter his family during World War II.

Cast
 Bel Powley as Miep Gies
 Liev Schreiber as Otto Frank
 Joe Cole as Jan Gies
 Amira Casar as Edith Frank
 Billie Boullet as Anne Frank
 Ashley Brooke as Margot Frank
 Daniel Donskoy as Karl Josef Silberbauer
 Noah Leggott as Young Cas

Production
It was announced in February 2022 that Disney+ had greenlit the miniseries from National Geographic, which Tony Phelan and Joan Rater will write and Susanna Fogel directing multiple episodes of the series. In April, Bel Powley was cast as Gies, with Liev Schreiber starring as Otto Frank and Joe Cole as Jan Gies. Amira Casar, Billie Boullet and Ashley Brooke would join in June, with Boullet cast as Anne Frank.

Production began by July 2022, with filming taking place between Hradec Králové, Prague and Amsterdam in summer 2022.

References

External links

Biographical television series
Cultural depictions of Anne Frank
Disney+ original programming
National Geographic (American TV channel) original programming
Television series by ABC Studios
Television shows filmed in the Czech Republic
Television shows filmed in the Netherlands
Upcoming drama television series